Yelizaveta Aleksandrovna Kozhevnikova (born 27 December 1973 in Moscow) is a Russian freestyle skier and Olympic medalist.

Career
Kozhevnikova competed for the Unified Team and received a silver medal at the 1992 Winter Olympics in Albertville, in moguls.

She won the bronze medal at the 1994 Winter Olympics in Lillehammer.

References

External links

1973 births
Living people
Russian female freestyle skiers
Freestyle skiers at the 1992 Winter Olympics
Freestyle skiers at the 1994 Winter Olympics
Olympic bronze medalists for Russia
Olympic silver medalists for the Unified Team
Olympic freestyle skiers of Russia
Olympic freestyle skiers of the Unified Team
Skiers from Moscow
Olympic medalists in freestyle skiing
Medalists at the 1992 Winter Olympics
Medalists at the 1994 Winter Olympics
Recipients of the Medal of the Order "For Merit to the Fatherland" II class
Honoured Masters of Sport of the USSR
Russian sports journalists
Sports commentators